Crash Ensemble is an Irish new music ensemble, which performs a range of contemporary classical music, as well as touring and organising festivals.

History
The group was founded in 1997 by composer Donnacha Dennehy, conductor and pianist Andrew Synott and clarinettist Michael Seaver; its first principal conductor was Alan Pierson.  It played its first concert in Dublin in 1997.

Membership
As of 2022, the group consists of 10 instrumentalists and current principal conductor Ryan McAdams, under the artistic direction of Donnacha Dennehy and Kate Ellis.

Members
In 2022, Crash Ensemble consisted of the musicians:
Kate Ellis (cello, artistic director)
Ryan McAdams (principal conductor)
Diamanda Dramm (violin, artist-in-residence)
Larissa O'Grady (violin)
Eliza McCarthy (piano, keyboards)
Andrew Zolinsky (piano, keyboards)
Susan Doyle (flute)
Barry O'Halpin (guitar, keyboards)
Brian Bolger (guitar)
Lisa Dowdall (viola)
Alex Petcu (percussion)
Roddy O'Keeffe (trombone)
Leonie Bluett (clarinet)
Malachy Robinson (double bass)
Caimin Gilmore (double bass)

and further, of:
Donnacha Dennehy (artistic partner)
Ian Dowdall (technical manager and front-of-house engineer)
Valerie Francis (stage production and monitor engineer)
Adrian Hart (production manager and electronics)
Aedín Cosgrove (lighting designer)
Matt Rafter (concerts manager and administrator)
Siân Cunningham (CEO)

Approach and performances
The ensemble uses video, lighting and sound amplification as an integral part of its project.

The ensemble has been particularly associated with totalist (post-minimalist) composers from the US and post-new Hague school composers from the Netherlands, as well as performing much music by Dennehy and other Irish composers and older pieces by the minimalist generation (including Steve Reich, Philip Glass, Louis Andriessen, Gavin Bryars, Roberto Carnevale, Kevin Volans and Terry Riley).  It has given premieres or commissioned work by Nico Muhly, Valgeir Sigurðsson, Peter Adriaansz, Raymond Deane, Arnold Dreyblatt, Stephen Gardner, Michael Gordon, John Godfrey, Andrew Hamilton, Jurgen Simpson, Gerhard Stabler, Jennifer Walshe, Ian Wilson, Linda Buckley, Judith Ring and Julie Feeney.

Crash has performed with many well-known artists from diverse musical backgrounds, such as Iarla Ó Lionáird, Dawn Upshaw, Gavin Friday, Steve Reich, Terry Riley, Gavin Bryars, Risa Jaroslaw & Dancers, Julie Feeney, Laura Moody, Niwel Tsumbu, Con Tempo Quartet and Sam Amidon.

Festival work 
Since 2002, Crash has been mounting its own contemporary music festivals in Dublin, in a similar manner to the Bang on a Can Festival in New York City, including adopting their popular 'marathon' format for their 2006 celebration of Reich and again in 2007 for their 10th year celebration 'Shindig'.

Touring
As well as touring in Ireland, Crash has performed in Canada, Denmark, Estonia, Germany, the Netherlands, Sweden, the UK, Australia and the United States.  They have recorded for New York labels Cantaloupe Music and Nonesuch Records.

Notes and references

External links
 http://www.crashensemble.com
 https://www.facebook.com/CrashEnsemble
 https://www.twitter.com/CrashEnsemble
 https://www.youtube.com/CrashEnsemble
 http://www.soundcloud.com/CrashEnsemble
 http://www.instagram.com/CrashEnsemble

Chamber music groups
Irish musical groups
Contemporary classical music ensembles